Electric Comic Book is the second album by the American rock band the Blues Magoos, the follow-up to their successful debut release Psychedelic Lollipop. The psychedelic garage rock style is followed again on this release but without a high-charting single. A couple of tracks, "Intermission" and "That's All Folks" (a very brief, hard-rocking parody of the Looney Tunes end theme) showcase the band's bizarre sense of humor.

One single was released from Electric Comic Book, "Pipe Dream" b/w "There's a Chance We Can Make It". However, "Summer is the Man" and "Life is Just a Cher O'Bowlies" were released as B-sides of two singles from their next album, Basic Blues Magoos.

Track listing

 "Pipe Dream" (Ron Gilbert, Ralph Scala) – 2:25
 "There's a Chance We Can Make It" (Gilbert, Scala) – 2:16
 "Life Is Just a Cher O'Bowlies" (Gilbert, Scala) – 2:37
 "Gloria" (Van Morrison) – 6:02
 "Intermission" (Mike Esposito) – 1:05
 "Albert Common is Dead" (Gilbert, Scala) – 1:49
 "Summer Is the Man" (Esposito, Gilbert) – 3:00
 "Baby, I Want You" (Gilbert, Emil Theilhelm) – 2:43
 "Let's Get Together" (Jimmy Reed) – 3:06
 "Take My Love" (Gilbert, Scala) – 1:51
 "Rush Hour" (Geoff Daking, Gilbert, Esposito) – 2:36
 "That's All Folks" (Blues Magoos) – :09

Personnel

Blues Magoos
 Ralph Scala – keyboards, vocals
 Emil "Peppy" Theilhelm – guitar, vocals
 Ron Gilbert – bass, vocals
 Mike Esposito – guitar
 Geoff Daking – drums, percussion

Technical
 Art Polhemus – producer, engineer
 Bob Wyld – producer 
 Ray Fox – liner notes

Charts
Album – Billboard (USA)

Album – RPM (Canada)

Singles – Billboard (USA)

Singles – RPM (Canada)

References

External links
 Classic Bands
 [ AllMusic entry]
 

1967 albums
Mercury Records albums
Repertoire Records albums
Blues Magoos albums